Mesolobus is an extinct genus of brachiopod belonging to the order Productida and family Rugosochonetidae.

Species 
M. inflata Liang, 1990
M. striatus Weller and McGehee, 1933

References 

Paleozoic animals
Productida